Phaleria perrottetiana is a plant in the family Thymelaeaceae.

Description
The twigs are dark brown. Inflorescences bear 20 or more flowers.

Distribution and habitat
Phaleria perrottetiana is native to the Philippines, Maluku Islands, New Guinea and the Solomon Islands. Its habitat is in forests from sea level to  altitude.

References

perrottetiana
Flora of the Philippines
Flora of the Maluku Islands
Flora of Papuasia
Plants described in 1843
Taxa named by Celestino Fernández-Villar
Taxa named by Joseph Decaisne